Spy Smasher  is a 12-episode 1942 Republic serial film based on the Fawcett Comics character Spy Smasher which is now a part of DC Comics. It was the 25th of the 66 serials produced by Republic. The serial was directed by William Witney with Kane Richmond and Marguerite Chapman as the leads. The serial was Chapman's big break into a career in film and television. Spy Smasher is a very highly regarded serial. In 1966, a television film was made from the serial footage under the title Spy Smasher Returns.

Plot
Alan Armstrong (Kane Richmond) as the Spy Smasher is a costumed vigilante and freelance agent, not associated with the US government as the country has not yet joined its allies in World War II. After discovering information about Nazi activities in occupied France, he is captured and ordered to be executed. However, with the help of Pierre Durand (Franco Corsaro), he escapes back to the United States, meeting with his twin brother Jack (Kane Richmond). Jack is incorrectly recognized and attacked by a Nazi agent on American soil. The agent works for a sabotage leader codenamed The Mask (Hans Schumm), who operates a U-boat near the coast. Eve Corby (Marguerite Chapman) plays Jack's fiancé.

The Mask's attacks on the United States begin with an attempt to flood the country with forged money and destroy the economy. When this is defeated, he continues with other attacks including destroying aircraft, oil and munitions intended for Britain. Constant defeats at the hands of Spy Smasher, with support from Jack Armstrong and Admiral Corby (Sam Flint), also leads the villain to take the fight back to the masked hero. In the end, the villain is killed aboard his own U-Boat in a sea of flaming oil.

Chapters

 America Beware (28min 32s)
 Human Target (17min 29s)
 Iron Coffin (16min 48s)
 Stratosphere Invaders (16min 50s)
 Descending Doom (16min 48s)
 The Invisible Witness (16min 39s)
 Secret Weapon (16min 53s)
 Sea Raiders (16min 45s)
 Highway Racketeers (16min 41s)
 2700° Fahrenheit (16min 56s)
 Hero's Death (16min 45s)
 V..._ (16min 40s)Source:

Cliffhangers
Chapter 11 has what film historians Harmon and Glut consider to be the "most unique chapter ending of them all": Spy Smasher is gunned down by enemy agents at point blank range and falls from the top of an office building to crash into the pavement below. In the resolution, the audience discover that Jack, Spy Smasher's brother, has knocked him out and stolen his costume. The real Spy Smasher turns up too late to save his twin. This is notable because in nearly every other chapter ending ever produced the person in danger manages to somehow survive.

Cast
Kane Richmond as "Spy Smasher", his secret identity Alan Armstrong and his twin brother Jack. The twin brother was added by Republic but other characters, including Admiral Corby, his daughter Eve and the villain The Mask, are all from the original comic. Harmon and Glut 1973, pp. 244–247, 250–251.</ref>
 Marguerite Chapman as Eve Corby, Admiral Corby's daughter and Jack Armstrong's fiancé.
 Sam Flint as Admiral Corby
 Hans Schumm as "The Mask". The Nazi villain of the serial "appeared just as often without the disguise as with it, the only purpose of the mask seemed to be to make him familiar to comic book fans".
 Tris Coffin as Drake, The Mask's spearhead heavy. Drake is a reporter working for the Ocean-wide Television Network. One of his espionage techniques was to leave the camera rolling after an interview inside Admiral Corby's office or a report from a crime scene. The broadcast was then picked up by the Mask in his submarine ("and presumably [by] the sets of any home viewer tuned into the proper channel").

Production
Spy Smasher was budgeted at $153,682 although the final negative cost was $156,431 (a $2,749, or 1.8%, overspend). It was the most expensive Republic serial of 1942. Spy Smasher was filmed between December 22, 1941 and January 29, 1942.  The serial's production number was 1196.

Spy Smasher's aircraft from the comic, the Gyrosub, was changed for the serial to be a secret Nazi aircraft called The Bat Plane. Mort Glickman echoed the "V for Victory" theme from Beethoven's 5th symphony in the Spy Smasher theme song. Both pieces of music include the "..._" Morse code for the letter V.

Columbia's The Secret Code, released later in 1942, was patterned after Spy Smasher. Adverts for the Columbia serial included the phrases "Smash spies with the Secret Service" and "Thrill again to spy smashers' biggest chase!"

Stunts
 Yakima Canutt - Republic's "Ram Rod" (Head of the stunt team)
 Carey Loftin as Alan/Jack Armstrong & Spy Smasher (doubling Kane Richmond)
 David Sharpe as Alan/Jack Armstrong & Spy Smasher (also doubling Kane Richmond)
 Ken Terrell (doubling Crane Whitley)
 Bud Wolfe (doubling Richard Bond)
 John Daheim
 James Fawcett
 Loren Riebe
 Duke Taylor

Kane Richmond did some of his own stunts but the most spectacular were performed by Dave Sharpe and Carey Loftin. Sharp for example, "rolled from an overturning motorcycle to leap atop a careening auto that plunged from a cliff". Loftin "showed what a motorcycle could do in the hands of an expert".

Special effects
All the special effects in Spy Smasher were created by Republic's in-house effects duo, the Lydecker brothers.

Release

Theatrical
Spy Smasher'''s official release date is April 4, 1942, although this is actually the date the sixth chapter was made available to film exchanges.

TelevisionSpy Smasher was one of 26 Republic serials re-released as a Century 66 film on television in 1966. The title of the film was changed to Spy Smasher Returns. This version was cut down to 100-minutes in length.

Critical reception
In the opinion of film historians Harmon and Glut, Spy Smasher is the best serial in terms of special effects and stunts, and one of the best in general: "Although lacking the beauty and imagination that appeals to a kind of racial unconscious in the Jungian sense that is found in Flash Gordon... Spy Smasher emerges in a class by itself, the foremost cliffhanger example of a whole school of Hollywood film-making in the 40s that gloried in matchless pure entertainment".  The script is consistently logical and well constructed with credible dialogue and good characterization. The cinematography is atmospheric and often artistic. According to Cline, Spy Smasher had a "very tight and fast-moving screenplay". In the words of Grant Tracey, writing on the Images Journal website, Spy Smasher is "perhaps one of the best serials of all time because of its stunning cliffhangers and unique innovations to the serial form".

References in other media
In the 2005 episode of the animated series Justice League Unlimited entitled "Patriot Act", Spy Smasher appears in a World War II flashback. The plot is unconnected to this serial, he is shown preventing the creation of Fawcett Comics supervillain, Captain Nazi. However, the style of the scene is based on a movie serial - it is drawn in black and white with similar action and background music.

See alsoAdventures of Captain Marvel (1941) is the other Republic serial based on a Fawcett comic
 List of film serials
 List of film serials by studio

References

Notes

Bibliography

 Cline, William C. In the Nick of Time. New York: McFarland & Company, Inc., 1984. .
 "In Search of the Ammunition" (The Sources). p. 23.
 "The Plotters of Peril" (The Writers). p. 64.
 "A&pg=PA74 Cheer for the Champions" (The Heros and Heroins). p. 74.
 "Guardians of the Sword" (The Assistants). p. 104.
 "Emissaries of Evil" (The Henchmen). p. 126.
 "They Who Also Serve" (The Citizens). pp. 140 & 145.
 "Sons of Adventure" (The Stuntmen). p. 155.
 "Soothing the Savage Beast" (The Music). p. 177.
 "The Iron Hand With a Velvet Glove" (The Directors). p. 184.
"Filmography: 1942". pp. 232–233.
 Farmer, James H. Celluloid Wings: The Impact of Movies on Aviation. Blue Ridge Summit, Pennsylvania: Tab Books Inc., 1984. .
 Harmon, Jim and Donald F. Glut. The Great Movie Serials: Their Sound and Fury. New York: Routledge Publishing, 1973. pp. 65, 172–274, 194. .
<li> "The Long-Underwear Boys "You've Met Me, Now Meet My Fist!" pp. 244–252<li>
 Mathis, Jack (né John David Mathis; 1931–2005). Valley of the Cliffhangers Supplement. South Barrington, Illinois: Jack Mathis Advertising, 1995. . 
 Tracey, Grant. Images: A Journal of Film and Popular Culture, Issue 4. Retrieved: November 1, 2014. .
 "Spy Smasher".
 The author, Toronto-born Grant Tracey, PhD (né Grant Annis George Tracey; born 1960), is a writer and professor (creative writing) affiliated with the University of Northern Iowa (Contemporary Authors. Vol. 240. by Julie Mellors Gale, 2006. )</ref>
 Weiss, Ken (né Kenneth Holden Weiss; 1932–2010) and Ed Goodgold (né Edwin F. Goodgold; born 1944). To be Continued  – A Complete Guide to Motion Picture Serials. New York: Bonanza Books, 1973. .

External links
 
 

1942 films
American black-and-white films
1940s English-language films
Films based on American comics
Republic Pictures film serials
American spy thriller films
Films directed by William Witney
World War II films made in wartime
Films set in the Caribbean
1940s spy thriller films
Films with screenplays by Joseph F. Poland
Films based on DC Comics